This is a list of recordings of Bach's cantata Ich will den Kreuzstab gerne tragen, BWV 56, a solo cantata for bass or bass-baritone composed for the 19th Sunday after Trinity, first performed on 29 October 1726. In English, it is commonly referred to as the Kreuzstab cantata.

The cantata was recorded as part of some complete and other incomplete series of recordings of Bach's church cantatas. As a solo cantata with expressive music, it has attracted singers outside Bach specialists. It has then often been coupled with another bass solo cantata, Ich habe genug, BWV 82, a paraphrase of the Song of Simeon.

Cantata 
Bach composed the church cantata for the 19th Sunday after Trinity, Ich will den Kreuzstab gerne tragen, BWV 56, as a solo cantata for bass. It is one of few works that he called a cantata. He led the first performance on 29 October 1726.

Recordings 
According to musicologist Martin Elste, the most frequently recorded cantatas of Bach have been the virtuoso solo cantatas 
Jauchzet Gott in allen Landen, BWV 50 for soprano and obbligato trumpet, Ich habe genug, BWV 82 for bass (with alternative versions for soprano, alto or mezzo-soprano) and the so-called "Kreuzstab cantata" for solo bass or bass-baritone Ich will den Kreuzstab gerne tragen, BWV 56. To these two rewarding choral cantatas should be added: Christ lag in Todes Banden, BWV 4 and the Actus tragicus, BWV 106. The Kreuzstab cantata has been recorded either separately, for example as a selection of  Fritz Werner's recordings, or as complete recordings of Bach's sacred cantatas BWV 1–200.  As a vocally demanding and expressive Bach cantata, it has often attracted recordings by soloists drawn from the broader world of opera and lieder singers. It is regularly coupled with Ich habe genug, BWV 82, a paraphrase of the Song of Simeon, and an impassioned cantata taking longing for death as its theme. A third work for bass has sometimes been included, the fragmentary cantata Der Friede sei mit dir, BWV 158, related to peace (Friede).

History

Bass solo cantatas 
The earliest extant recording was a live concert performance, broadcast in 1939, by Texas-born baritone Mack Harrell with Eduard van Beinum conducting the Concertgebouw Orchestra: it showed a similar large-scale approach to Bach as Willem Mengelberg, van Beinum's predecessor. There was a second recording in 1958 by Harrell at St. Paul’s Episcopal Church, Cleveland, directed by Robert Shaw with the RCA Victor Orchestra and Choir. For that later recording, Jonathan Woolf writes: "Mack was seemingly the most instinctively noble of singers. There is an unselfconscious gravity in his singing but never one that elides into the statuesque." 

As a result of mentoring by Harrell at Aspen and then Juilliard School, New York, Kansas-born baritone Barry McDaniel moved to Germany as a Fulbright Scholar, eventually becoming a permanent member of the Deutsche Oper in Berlin, where he acquired the former villa of Third Reich architect Albert Speer near Großer Wannsee. In 1964, at the height of his career, he recorded the Kreuzstab cantata with Fritz Werner, the Pforzheim Chamber Orchestra and Heinrich-Schütz-Chor Heilbronn; taking wide-spanning melismas in a single breath, McDaniel's dignified yet emotional rendition has been rated by Jonathan Freeman-Attwood of Gramophone as being in a league of its own.

In 1950–51, 26-year-old Dietrich Fischer-Dieskau featured as soloist in the cantata as part of Karl Ristenpart's project to record all Bach church cantatas with the RIAS Kammerchor and its orchestra, broadcast live by radio in church services. Ristenpart used small ensembles compared to other groups at that period. The project was never completed and in particular omitted Ich habe genug, BWV 82.

In 1977, Max van Egmond was the soloist in a recording of BWV 56 coupled with BWV 82, with oboist Paul Dombrecht and conductor Frans Brüggen. Peter Kooy and oboist Marcel Ponseele were the soloists for a recording of the two cantatas and BWV  158, with Philippe Herreweghe conducting Choir and Orchestra of La Chapelle Royale. In 1997, there was also a live video recording with Klaus Mertens and oboist Marcel Ponseele, directed from the keyboard by Ton Koopman with the Amsterdam Baroque Orchestra & Choir.

Complete series of Bach's church cantatas 
In the series of church cantatas for Telefunken, known as the Teldec series, shared by Nikolaus Harnoncourt and  Gustav Leonhardt in their pursuit in historically informed performances with all-male singers and period instruments, the Cross-staff cantata was recorded in 1976 by Michael Schopper, the Knabenchor Hannover and the Leonhardt-Consort, conducted by Leonhardt.

Helmuth Rilling, who recorded all Bach cantatas from 1969 to 1985, recorded the cantata in 1983, with Fischer-Dieskau, the Gächinger Kantorei and Bach-Collegium Stuttgart. 

Pieter Jan Leusink conducted all Bach church cantatas with the Holland Boys Choir and the Netherlands Bach Collegium in historically informed performance, however with women for the solo soprano parts. He completed the project within a year on the occasion of the Bach Year 2000. A reviewer from Gramophone noted: "Leusink's success elsewhere comes largely through his admirably well-judged feeling for tempos and a means of accentuation which drives the music forward inexorably". He recorded the cantata in 1999 with his regular bass Bas Ramselaar.

Masaaki Suzuki, who studied historically informed practice in Europe, began recording Bach's church cantatas with the Bach Collegium Japan in 1999, at first not aiming at a complete cycle, but completing all in 2017. They recorded the cantata in 2005, with Peter Kooy as the singer.

Sigiswald Kuijken recorded a series of church cantatas, combined by their liturgical function, with the ensemble La Petite Bande, with vocalists singing one voice per part (OVPP). They recorded the cantata in 2006, with singer Dominik Wörner.

Table of recordings 
The following table is derived mostly from the listings on the Bach Cantatas website. The table lists the recording's title in the first column, conductor, choirs (for the closing chorale) and orchestra in the second column, the bass soloist in the third (along with the oboist where credited), the label in the fourth, and the year (normally of release) in the sixth column. A seventh column marks if a choir performs with one voice per part (OVPP), and an eighth column shows if the ensemble plays period instruments in historically informed performance.

References

Cited sources 
 
 
 
 
 
 
 
 
 
 
 
 
 
 
 
 

 
 
 

Ich will den Kreuzstab gerne tragen, BWV 56